The Peuchen (also known as Piuchen, Pihuchen, Pihuychen, Pihuichen, Piguchen, or Piwuchen) is a creature from the Mapuche mythology and Chilote mythology pertaining to southern Chile, a much feared shapeshifting creature that can instantly change into animal form. According to legend, El Peuchen takes the hearts of its victims without leaving a mark on the body.

It has often been described as a gigantic flying snake which produced strange whistling sounds, while its gaze could paralyze an intended victim and permit it to suck its blood. It has often been reported as the cause of blood being sucked from one's sheep.

The creature can be eliminated by a machi (Mapuche herbal healer).

See also
 Colo Colo
 Basilisco Chilote
 Chonchon
 Chupacabra

Notes

References

Chilote legendary creatures
Indigenous South American legendary creatures
Mapuche legendary creatures
Mythological hematophages
Shapeshifting
Mythological hybrids
Latin American folklore
Legendary serpents
Dragons